The Isthmian Canal Commission was a commission created by congress in 1899 "to determine the most feasible and practicable route" in Central America to build a canal. The commission was chaired by John G. Walker, even though he chaired another congressional commission called the Nicaragua Canal Commission, which had not yet issued its final report, which was released in mid-1899 and, true to its name, recommended the locale of Nicaragua for the construction of a canal. This change of focus was a triumph for the lobbyist William Nelson Cromwell, who was hired by French interests wanting to get rid of the assets of the failed enterprise of Ferdinand de Lesseps.

The commission issued its report on 16 November 1901, recommending once again Nicaragua, disregarding Panama because La Compagnie Nouvelle du Canal de Panama—the throwaway company under which the French assets were organized—charged over $109 million for everything, which Walker found much too high. After some further lobbying by Cromwell and also Philippe Bunau-Varilla, the makeshift company lowered the price to $40 million on 4 January 1902. The Commission hastily reconvened on Theodore Roosevelt's urging to reconsider the question after which Panama was declared the preferred route.

References 

Panama Canal Zone
1890s in Panama